DZRS (1179 AM) was a radio station owned and operated by Radio Sorsogon Network. Its studios & transmitter were located at Don Luis Lee Bldg., Plaza Bonifacio, Sirangan, Sorsogon City which is now being demolished.

Established in 1982 as DZRS Radyo Sorsogon, it went off the air on November 2006 after its transmitter was knocked down by Typhoon Reming.

References

Radio stations in Sorsogon
Radio stations established in 1982
Radio stations disestablished in 2006